Capital Gate, also known as the Leaning Tower of Abu Dhabi, is a skyscraper in Abu Dhabi that is over  tall, 35 stories high, with over  of usable office space. Capital Gate is one of the tallest buildings in the city and was designed to incline 18° west. The building is owned and was developed by the Abu Dhabi National Exhibitions Company. The tower is the focal point of Capital Centre.

Construction

Project timeline

Foundation 
The deep pilings provide stability against strong winds, gravitational pull, and seismic pressures that arise due to the incline of the building. Some of the piles were only initially compressed during construction to support the lower floors of the building. Now they are in tension as additional stress caused by the overhang has been applied.

Core of the structure 
The core of the Capital Gate was built using jumping formwork, also known as climbing formwork. The center concrete core had to be specially designed to account for the immense forces created by the building's angle of elevation, or camber. The core contains  of concrete reinforced with 10,000 metric tons of steel and uses vertical post-tension and was constructed with a vertical pre-camber. This pre-camber means the core was constructed with a slight opposite lean. As each floor was installed, the weight of the floors and diagonal grid, or diagrid, system pulled the core and slowly straightened it out.

Superstructure 
Given the 18° lean of the building, the construction required two diagrid systems: an external diagrid defining the tower's shape and an internal diagrid linked to the central core by eight unique, pin-jointed structural members. The external diagrid comprises 720 sections of varying shapes, as it is based on the direction in which the tower leans. The external grid carries the weight of the floor while the internal diagrid connects with the external and transfers the load to the core, thereby eliminating the need for columns in the floor.

World record 
In June 2010, Guinness World Records recognized Capital Gate tower as the world's "farthest manmade leaning building". The new record shows that the Capital Gate tower has been built to lean 18° west, which is more than four times that of the Leaning Tower of Suurhusen. The Guinness World Records recognition was given by a Guinness-appointed awards committee in January 2010, when the exterior was completed.

Architecture and design 
The building has a diagrid specially designed to absorb and channel the forces created by wind and seismic loading, as well as the gradient of Capital Gate. Capital Gate is one of only a handful of diagrid buildings in the world. Others include London's 30 St Mary Axe (Gherkin), New York's Hearst Tower, and Beijing's National Stadium.

Capital Gate was designed by architectural firm RMJM and was completed in 2011. The tower includes  of office space and the Andaz Hotel on floors 18 through 33.

See also 
 List of tallest buildings in Abu Dhabi
 Inclined building
 List of twisted buildings

References

External links 
 Capital Gate official website
 Capital Gate Tower at CTBUH website
 The Architects Perspective - The Capital Gate
 the Capital Gate - rmjm

Inclined towers
2011 establishments in the United Arab Emirates
Hotel buildings completed in 2011
Office buildings completed in 2011
Skyscraper office buildings in Abu Dhabi
Skyscraper hotels in Abu Dhabi

pepepopo